Humayun Iqbal (H Iqbal) (Urdu ہمایوں اقبال  ایچ اقبال) is a Pakistani novelist and poet. He was born on July 6, 1941, in Rampur and currently lives in Karachi, Pakistan.

After Ibn-e-Safi, H Iqbal created his own spy series Parmod Series or “Major Parmod Series” in August 1965. His characters,Major Parmod and Colonel D are famous spies in Urdu.

His other notable books:
 Mustaqbil Shanas
 Janbaz
 Chalawa

References

1941 births
Living people
People from Rampur, Uttar Pradesh
Novelists from Uttar Pradesh
Poets from Uttar Pradesh
Pakistani male poets
Pakistani spy fiction writers
20th-century Pakistani male writers
Poets from Karachi
20th-century Pakistani poets
21st-century Pakistani poets
Indian male poets
20th-century Indian male writers
21st-century Indian male writers
Urdu-language writers from British India